The Angel of Darkness is a 1997 crime novel by Caleb Carr that was published by Random House and is both a sequel to The Alienist (1994) and the second book in the Kreizler series.

Plot summary
The now-adult Stevie Taggert, a tobacconist, makes a bet with an elderly John Moore that he can write the story of one of their adventures together as well as Moore (a former newspaper reporter) could.

Set in 1897, Dr. Laszlo Kreizler's associate, Sara Howard, now a private detective, comes to him for help in locating Ana Linares, the kidnapped infant daughter of a visiting Spanish dignitary. The mystery is complicated by rising tensions between Spain and the United States, and war in Cuba seems inevitable. Kreizler re-convenes his old "team": Sara; John; NYPD detectives and forensic specialists Marcus and Lucius Isaacson; and Kreizler's faithful servants, Stevie and Cyrus. Their search for the missing child leads them to contact with an enigmatic woman with a murderous past, who enjoys the protection of the Hudson Dusters, a notorious gang.

Historical figures in the novel
 Cecilia Beaux
 Clarence Darrow
 Theodore Roosevelt
 Albert Pinkham Ryder
 Elizabeth Cady Stanton
 Cornelius Vanderbilt II
 William Alanson White

In other media

Television

In 2018, TNT released The Alienist, a ten-episode limited series first aired as a sneak peek on January 21, 2018, before its official premiere on January 22, 2018, and ended on March 26, 2018, based on the novel of the same name by Caleb Carr. The series stars Daniel Brühl, Luke Evans, and Dakota Fanning as an ad hoc team assembled in mid-1890s New York City to investigate a serial killer of street children.

On August 16, 2018, TNT ordered a sequel series based upon the follow-up novel The Angel of Darkness.

See also

 1997 in literature
 Lydia Sherman

References

External links
 17thstreet.netcomprehensive site dedicated to The Alienist and The Angel of Darkness

1997 American novels
American crime novels
Cultural depictions of Clarence Darrow
Cultural depictions of Theodore Roosevelt
English-language novels
Fiction set in 1897
Novels by Caleb Carr
Novels set in the 19th century
Random House books